Nutbourne is a village in the Chichester District of West Sussex, England located  east of Emsworth on the A259 road. It is in the civil parishes of Southbourne and Chidham and Hambrook.

This small village on the south side of the former A27 road, now the A259, has a loop of road running through it with a ford on the south side of the village centre. It lies at the northern tip of Thorney Channel, an inlet of Chichester Harbour.

See also
Nutbourne railway station

External links

Villages in West Sussex
Southbourne, West Sussex